The discography of English singer Taio Cruz consists of three studio albums, one compilation album, one live album, one extended play, twenty singles (including six as a featured artist) and twenty-three music videos. After signing a publishing deal at the age of 19, Cruz released his debut studio album, Departure in 2006; it reached number 17 on the UK Albums Chart and was certified gold by the British Phonographic Industry (BPI). The album contained five singles, all of which reached the top 30 of the UK Singles Chart: "Come On Girl", which peaked at number five, was the most successful of these singles.

Cruz released his second album, Rokstarr, on 12 October 2009, preceded by the commercially successful single "Break Your Heart". It became his first single to top the UK Singles Chart, whilst a remixed version featuring vocals from American rapper Ludacris topped the Canadian and Swiss singles charts as well as the US Billboard Hot 100. Rokstarr also featured the singles "No Other One", "Dirty Picture", "Dynamite", "Higher" and "Falling in Love". "Dynamite" topped the British and American singles charts, and was later certified sextuple platinum by the Recording Industry Association of America (RIAA).

In 2011, Cruz collaborated with French house musician David Guetta and Ludacris on the single "Little Bad Girl": it reached number four in the United Kingdom and number five in Austria and Germany. Cruz's third album, TY.O was also released in 2011, from which five singles were released: "Hangover", "Troublemaker", "There She Goes", "World in Our Hands" and "Fast Car". "Hangover" reached number one in Austria and Switzerland, and "Troublemaker" charted at number three in the United Kingdom.

Albums

Studio albums

Compilation albums

Live albums

Extended plays

Singles

As lead artist

As featured artist

Other appearances

Music videos

References

Notes

A  The single version of "Break Your Heart" released in the United Kingdom does not feature Ludacris.
B  Three single versions of "Higher" were released: the first features Kylie Minogue, the second features Travie McCoy and the third features them both.
C  The single version of "There She Goes" released in the United Kingdom does not feature Pitbull.

Sources

External links
 Official website
 Taio Cruz at AllMusic
 
 

Discographies of British artists